The Package Killer is the name attributed to an American serial killer who murdered between three and five women in the St. Louis area from 1990 to 1991. His pseudonym comes from the receptacles the victims were sometimes found in. 

On September 19, 2022, convicted killer Gary Muehlberg was charged with the murders.

Murders 
On March 26, 1990, the body of 19-year-old Robyn J. Mihan was discovered alongside a Highway stuffed between two mattresses in Silex, Missouri. She had been reported missing four days prior on March 22. An autopsy showed that she had been strangled, and her hands were bound together. She had worked as a prostitute. 

On June 11, 1990, the body of 40-year-old Donna Reitmeyer was found inside of a rubber trash bin near South Broadway. Her body was so badly decomposed that the cause of death remains unknown, but signs of violence were located.  

On October 4, the body of a woman was found inside of a plastic trash can along a roadside near Interstate 270 by a jogger who had noticed a foul odor. The woman remained unidentified for months, until police were able to confirm the woman was 27-year-old Brenda Jean Pruitt, whose family had reported her missing on May 9.

On February 17, 1991, the body of a woman was found stuffed in a wooden box along the I-70. The victim was found to have been wearing a stocking cap, and authorities released the type of cap in hopes to identify the body. She was identified as 21-year-old Sandy Little, who had been missing since September 4, 1990. She was found to have worked as a sex worker. 

On May 12, 1991, the body of 37-year-old Sandra Cain was found on the road along Interstate 44. An autopsy wasn't able to confirm the cause of death, but narrowed it down that she either had been hit by a car or thrown off the overpass. Cain had worked as a sex worker, and reportedly, victim Sandy Little had told Cain to not go with a man in a station wagon. It is speculated that the man is the killer.

Investigation 
The three murders were connected, and they contributed to the murders to the work of a serial killer. The perpetrator was named The Package Killer due to the manner in which he disposed of the bodies. The FBI joined the investigation in 1991. Investigators first identified one man, a 34-year-old St. Louis resident, as a possible suspect. The man had been accused of torturing and raping several local prostitutes. The man was questioned, but denied responsibility for the murders.

Gary Muehlberg 
In April 2022, investigators from the St. Charles County Police Crime Lab linked 73-year-old Gary Randall Muehlberg to one of the murders. The identification came from DNA evidence left at the crime scene, which had been entered through CODIS and matched with Muehlberg's prison sample. That same month a detective named Jodi Weber visited Muehlberg at Potosi Correctional Center, where he was serving a life sentence for killing Kenneth Atchison in 1993. During their communications, he admitted to killing Mihan, Pruitt, and Little. In mid-September 2022 prosecutors sent letters to Muehlberg promising they would not seek the death penalty. He then confessed to killing Reitmeyer and a Jane Doe. He has been charged with four counts of first-degree murder. On March 6, 2023, Muehlberg received a life sentence for the murder of Sandy Little, and is expected to plead guilty to the remaining murder charges later in March.

See also 
 List of serial killers in the United States

References 

1990 murders in the United States
20th-century American criminals
American rapists
American serial killers
Crimes against sex workers in the United States
Crimes in Missouri
Criminals from Missouri
Murder in Missouri
History of women in Missouri